Kevin W. Fitzgerald (January 31, 1950 – October 1, 2007) was an American politician and guidance counselor.

Fitzgerald was born in Boston, Massachusetts. He went to Mission Hill High School and Saint Anselm College. Fitzgerald  was a guidance counselor and lived in Mission Hill, Boston with his wife and family. He served in the Massachusetts House of Representatives from 1975 until 2003 and was a Democrat. He died from cancer in Boston, Massachusetts.

Notes

1950 births
2007 deaths
People from Mission Hill, Boston
Politicians from Boston
Saint Anselm College alumni
Democratic Party members of the Massachusetts House of Representatives
Deaths from cancer in Massachusetts
20th-century American politicians